is a type of Japanese pottery traditionally from Shimada, Shizuoka.

External links 
 http://www.shizuoka-kougei.jp/019.html
 http://www.sidoro-ritou.com

Culture in Shizuoka Prefecture
Japanese pottery